Events from the year 1594 in Ireland.

Incumbent
Monarch: Elizabeth I

Events
August 18 – the monks of the abbey on Innisfallen Island are dispossessed by the Crown.
Enniskillen Castle is besieged and captured by the English under Captain John Dowdall. It is subsequently retaken by Rory Maguire and recaptured by William Russell (Lord Deputy of Ireland).

Births
November 26 – Sir James Ware, historian, politician and Auditor general for Ireland (died 1666)

Deaths
Sir William Weston, Chief Justice of the Irish Common Pleas (b. c.1546)

References

 
1590s in Ireland
Ireland
Years of the 16th century in Ireland